Lipsius is the surname of the following persons:

 Constantin Lipsius (1832–1894), German architect
 Ida Marie Lipsius (1837–1927), German writer and music historian
 Justus Lipsius (1547–1606), Flemish humanist
 Justus Hermann Lipsius (1834–1920), German classical scholar
 Richard Adelbert Lipsius (1830–1892), German theologian
 Fred Lipsius (born 1943), American musician